Borsigwerke is a Berlin U-Bahn station located on the .

The northern entrance was integrated into the famous brick entrance building of the Borsig Factory. The walls of the platform are covered with yellow tiles.

Notes 

U6 (Berlin U-Bahn) stations
Buildings and structures in Reinickendorf
Railway stations in Germany opened in 1958